Ten Doesschate, (Ten) Doeschate or Ten Doeschot is a rather uncommon Dutch toponymic surname. The name derives from a farm named Doeschot near Goor in the province of Overijssel. Notable people with the surname include:

 Gezienus ten Doesschate (1885 - 1964), Dutch ophthalmologist, amateur painter and historian
  (1904 - 1964), Dutch business economist 
 Jurriaan ten Doesschate (1912 – 1977), Dutch ophthalmologist and medical scientist
 Petra ten-Doesschate-Chu (born 1942), Dutch art historian at Seton Hall University 
 Ryan ten Doeschate (born 1980), Dutch cricketer

References

Dutch-language surnames
Toponymic surnames